Ramenye may refer to:

 Ramenye, Suzdalsky District, Vladimir Oblast
 Ramenye, Vyaznikovsky District, Vladimir Oblast
 Ramenye, Gryazovetsky District, Vologda Oblast
 Ramenye, Kichmengsko-Gorodetsky District, Vologda Oblast
 Ramenye, Sheksninsky District, Vologda Oblast
 Ramenye, Tarnogsky District, Vologda Oblast